Vagococcus fessus is a Gram-positive, facultatively anaerobic and coccus-shaped bacterium from the genus of Vagococcus which has been isolated from a dead seal and a dead harbour porpoise.

References 

Lactobacillales
Bacteria described in 2000